Ust-Pogozhye is a rural locality (a selo) and the administrative center of Ust-Pogozhinskoye Rural Settlement, Dubovsky District, Volgograd Oblast, Russia. The population was 1,067 as of 2010. There are 14 streets.

Geography 
Ust-Pogozhye is located in steppe, on the right bank of the Pogozhaya River, 66 km northwest of Dubovka (the district's administrative centre) by road. Semyonovka is the nearest rural locality.

References 

Rural localities in Dubovsky District, Volgograd Oblast